Nikolaos Petrou Deligiannis (Greek : Νικόλαος Πέτρου Δηλιγιάννης, 1845, Athens – 5 January 1910, Paris) was the caretaker Prime Minister of Greece from January to June 1895.

Biography 

He studied law at the University of Athens and made his career in the diplomatic corps. He was first appointed secretary of the Greek embassy in Constantinople and then served as ambassador in Belgrade (1881–1885), Paris (1885–1893) and in Madrid. He returned to Athens and after a while he left Paris again, where he was appointed Ambassador of Greece. In 1899 he was a representative of Greece in the Hague Conference. He was also a founding member of the Hellenic Olympic Committee.

In January 1895, after the fall of the seventh and last  of Charilaos Trikoupis, he was appointed by George I as caretaker Prime Minister. The , composed of extra-parliamentary figures, in which he also held the Foreign and Interior portfolios, conducted elections which took place in May of the same year. They were won by Theodore Deligiannis, a first cousin of his father, who accessed as Prime Minister on May 31, 1895. Nikolaos Deligiannis returned to the diplomatic service as ambassador in Paris, where he died and was buried in the cemetery of Boulogne.

Family 
His wife was Amalia , sister of N. Baltatzi, lady-in-waiting, and Elena (Elisa) Baltatzi, wife of Alexandros , ambassador in Belgrade. They had three children. Their daughter and a son, officer in the Hellenic Army, had already died when Nikolaos Deligiannis died. The third child, Petros Deligiannis, was also a diplomat, secretary of the embassy in Washington, and Consul at the embassy in Paris in 1890.

References

1845 births
1910 deaths
19th-century prime ministers of Greece
Foreign ministers of Greece
Politicians from Athens
Prime Ministers of Greece
Ambassadors of Greece to France
Ambassadors of Greece to Serbia
Ambassadors of Greece to Spain
National and Kapodistrian University of Athens alumni